This is a list of operas  written by the French composer Étienne Méhul (1763–1817). Aside from La taupe et les papillons, which was never performed, all premieres took place in Paris.

List

References
Sources
Bartlet, M Elizabeth C (1992), 'Méhul, Étienne-Nicolas' in The New Grove Dictionary of Opera, ed. Stanley Sadie (London) 

 
Lists of operas by composer
Lists of compositions by composer
Paris-related lists